Jefferson Avenue School is a historic school building located at Bristol, Bucks County, Pennsylvania. It was built in 1908, and is a three-story with basement, fieldstone schoolhouse building with limestone trim and a hipped roof.  It features Georgian Revival detailing including a large central frontispiece with a large semi-elliptical window. About 1986 the school was renovated and became apartments or condominiums.

It was added to the National Register of Historic Places in 1985.

References

School buildings on the National Register of Historic Places in Pennsylvania
School buildings completed in 1908
Schools in Bucks County, Pennsylvania
National Register of Historic Places in Bucks County, Pennsylvania
1908 establishments in Pennsylvania